Towcester Racecourse is a greyhound racing track and former horse racing venue at Towcester (pronounced "Toh-ster") in Northamptonshire, England.  It has staged the English Greyhound Derby in 2018, 2021 and has won the contract for the next 5 years from 2022.

Horse Racing 
The first meeting took place in 1928. The Towcester Racecourse Company was formed under the direction of Sir Thomas Fermor-Hesketh, later 1st Lord Hesketh, and it was there on his estate of Easton Neston, that the course was sited, and the first grandstand built.
 
Towcester was highly popular among the racing fraternity, mostly because of the sharp bends in the course, and the final gallop to the finishing post was uphill, which tested the horses and results in some unexpected finishes.

In 2004, the Easton Neston estate, including the race course was put up for sale. The third Lord Hesketh later decided to retain ownership of the course and sold only a portion of the estate to a Russian-born businessman.

Entry was free from 2002 until 2006, during which time the course saw attendance grow significantly. In mid-2006, it was announced that from the 26th of December 2006, Towcester would be charging for entry to their two most popular annual meetings; Boxing Day and Easter Sunday. Selected other meetings were free.

In 2008, Lord Hesketh decided to sell the course which was offered as a going concern.

On 7 November 2013, jockey Tony McCoy got his 4,000th career win at Towcester, riding Mountain Tunes to win the Weatherbys Novices' Hurdle.

Greyhound Racing 

A greyhound racing track has been built inside the racecourse, which opened in December 2014.

2018 administration 
In August 2018 the future of Towcester racecourse was put in doubt. A statement released by the racecourse on 16 August read: "Towcester Racecourse Company Limited, proprietors of Towcester Racecourse, are currently experiencing trading difficulties and are in discussions with key stakeholders and professional advisers on the way forward. However, the directors have concluded that they have no alternative in the short term but to seek court protection and are now taking steps to place the company into administration. As a result, it is with regret that the greyhound meetings on this Friday, 17 August, and over the weekend at Towcester Racecourse have been cancelled.

"Whilst inevitably there will be considerable interest from customers, supporters and suppliers, the directors ask that they be given time to focus on exploring other options for the business and they anticipate there will be a further update in the next few days.

"The directors remain hopeful that despite the current situation, given the significant history of horseracing and more recently greyhound racing at Towcester, there will be significant interest from potential acquirers".

On 23 August KPMG were appointed as administrators and 134 out of 137 members of staff at the racecourse were made redundant, many having to claim statutory redundancy from the government. On 13 November it was announced by the administrators that the racecourse's assets were being sold to a company called Fermor Land LLP.  This company was formed on 18 October (26 days before the sale) and is headed by Lord Hesketh's brother-in-law Mark Westropp, a trustee of the Hesketh Family trusts.

In late October 2019 Kevin Boothby signed a 10-year lease deal for Towcester Racecourse.

References

External links
Official website
Towcester Racecourse & Leisure Health & Hygiene
Course guide on GG.COM
Towcester Live Race

Defunct horse racing venues in England
Sports venues in Northamptonshire
Music venues completed in 1928
1928 establishments in England
Sports venues completed in 1928